Kateretidae also known as short-winged flower beetles are a family of beetles in the superfamily Cucujoidea. There are 10 extant and 4 extinct genera, and at least 40 described species. They are found worldwide except in New Zealand. Adults are anthophagous, feeding on flowers, while the larvae are spermatophagous inside the flower corolla.

Genera
 Amartus LeConte, 1861 i c g b
 Anamartus Jelinek, 1976 g
 Anthonaeus Horn, 1879 i c g b
 Boreades Parson, 1943 i c g
 Brachyleptus Motschulsky, 1845 g
 Brachypterolus Grouvelle, 1913 i c g b
 Brachypterus Kugelann, 1794 i c g b
 Heterhelus DuVal, 1858 i c g b
 Kateretes Herbst, 1793 i c g b
 Neobrachypterus Jelínek, 1979 i c g
†Cretaretes Peris and Jelínek 2019 Burmese amber, Myanmar, Late Cretaceous (Cenomanian)
†Eoceniretes Kirejtshuk & Nel, 2008 g
†Furcalabratum Poinar and Brown, 2018, Burmese amber, Myanmar, Cenomanian
†Lebanoretes Kirejtshuk and Azar 2008 Lebanese amber, Early Cretaceous (Barremian)
Data sources: i = ITIS, c = Catalogue of Life, g = GBIF, b = Bugguide.net

References

External links

 
 

 
Cucujoidea families